Uttoxeter Rural is a civil parish in the borough of East Staffordshire, Staffordshire, England, comprising the villages of Stramshall and Bramshall. It is separate from the town of Uttoxeter, and surrounds it to the north, west and south. The population was 1,567 at the 2001 census, increasing to 1,635 at the 2011 Census.

Until 1974, there was a Uttoxeter Rural District that covered a larger area.

Representatives
In East Staffordshire Borough Council Uttoxeter Rural is covered by the Abbey ward and is represented by Christopher Smith of the Conservative Party.

In Staffordshire County Council Uttoxeter Rural is part of the larger ward of the same name and is represented by Philip Atkins of the Conservative Party who is also the leader of Staffordshire County Council. 

Uttoxeter Rural is considered a safe Conservative seat.

See also
Listed buildings in Uttoxeter Rural

References

Civil parishes in Staffordshire
Borough of East Staffordshire